The 30e Escadre de Chasse or 30th Hunter Escadre is a wing of the Fighter Brigade of the French Air and Space Force. It consists of several flying squadrons and support units.

History

Tours 

Representing the traditions of the Night Hunter Fighter Group 1/31- Groupe de Chasse de Nuit 1/31 Lorraine, the 30th Mixed Instruction and Night Hunter Escadre - 30e Escadre Mixte d'Instruction et de Chasse de Nuit was created on 1 May 1953 on the base of Tours. Flying the Gloster Meteor NF.11, the latter comprised three night hunter fighter squadrons : Escadron de Chasse de Nuit (ECN) 1/30 Loire, Escadron de Chasse de Nuit 2/30 Camargue , Escadron de Chasse de Nuit 3/30 Lorraine. The "Camargue" possessed a couple of Meteor Mk.7 for the transformation of new pilots on the English jet. 
As of 1957, the Escadre passed to Vautour IIN and became an all-weather fighter wing - the 30e Escadre de Chasse Tout Temps on 1 May 1957. During the same time, the Camargue Squadron was dissolved.

At Reims on Vautour

With the return from Morocco of the Hunter Fighter Pilot School which left Aerial Base 708 Meknes and moved to Tours Air Base, the 30th Escadre moved to Reims, however the latter's squadrons were spread over three bases. Between October 1961 and July 1962, the "1/30 Loire" was attached to the 10e Escadre de Chasse at Aerial Base 110 Creil. The "3/30 Lorraine" garrisoned at Reims. The 2/6 Normandie-Niemen left the Aerial Base 141 Oran la Sénia for Aerial Base 115 Orange-Caritat, where the later became the 2/30 Normandie-Niemen. 

In July 1965 the "1/30 Loire", which had garrisoned at Reims since August 1962, was dissolved. 

One year later the "2/30" left Orange to move to Reims. 

The two squadrons of the 30e Escadre flew on Vautour IIN until 1973.

On Mirage F1C 

On 20 December 1973 the seven Mirage F1C arrived at Reims to equip the 2/30 Normandie-Niemen. The 30e ECTT became then the 30e Escadre de Chasse (30e EC). 

Following the dissolution of the 10e Escadre de Chasse and the closure of the Aerial Base of Creil in June 1985, the Hunter Fighter Squadron - Escadron de Chasse 1/10 Valois recently transformed on Mirage F1C garrisoned at Reims and became the "1/30 Valois". 

The 30e EC accordingly possessed three Hunter Fighter Squadrons, each equipped with 15 single-seat Mirage F1C.   

On 1 July 1988 the "3/10 Vexin" on the Aerial Base of Djibouti, on Mirage F1C, was attached to the 30e Escadre while assuming the denomination of "4/30 Vexin".

In July 1988 the "3/30" inherited pilots on the Mirage F1 from the transformation mission (until then reserved for the Fighter Hunter Squadron -Escadron de chasse 3/5 Comtat Venaissin on Aerial Base 115 Orange-Caritat). The squadron gained the enrichment of the third Escadrille (SPA 62) and Mirage F1B biplaces.

The end 

The 30e Escadre de Chasse was dissolved on the Aerial Base of Reims on 27 June 1994. The "1/30 Valois" was dissolved the same day, while the other three squadrons kept for a couple more years their inherited enumeration of the "30".

The recreation 

The 30e Escadre de Chasse was reformed on the Aerial Base 118 Mont-de-Marsan on 3 September 2015. The Escadre is equipped with multi-role hunters Dassault Rafale.

Composition 

As of 9 September 2015 the 30e Escadre is composed of the following units:

 Escadron de chasse et d'expérimentation 5/330 Côte d'Argent
 Escadron de Chasse 2/30 Normandie-Niemen
 Escadron de Chasse 3/30 Lorraine
 Escadron de soutien technique aéronautique ESTA.15/30 Chalosse
 Centre de formation Rafale 23/30
 Équipe technique interarmées Rafale 61/30

Historic Squadrons

Loire 
 Escadron de Chasse 1/30 Loire : from 1 May 1953 until 1 October 1961 and from 1 July 1962 until 1 March 1965.

Camargue 
 Escadron de Chasse 2/30 Camargue

Lorraine 
 Escadron de Chasse 3/30 Lorraine
 Escadron de Chasse Tout Temps 3/30 Lorraine

Normandie-Niémen 
 Escadron de Chasse 2/30 Normandie-Niemen 
 Escadron de Chasse Tout Temps 2/30 Normandie-Niémen

Valois 
 Escadron de chasse 1/30 Valois

Vexin 
 Escadron de chasse 4/30 Vexin

Air Bases 

 Air Base 705 Tours: from 1 May 1953 to March 1961
 Air Base 112 Reims-Champagne: from March 1961 to 27 June 1994 
 Air Base 118 Djibouti: from 1 August 1988 until 27 June 1994
 Mont-de-Marsan Air Base: from 3 September 2015 - present

Aircraft 
 Gloster Meteor NF.11 (1953-1957)
 MD-315 (1954-1972)
 Vautour IIN (1957-1974)
 Mirage F1C (1973-1994)
 Mirage F1B (1988-1994)
 Dassault Rafale (as of September 2015)

References

Military units and formations of the French Air and Space Force
Fighter aircraft units and formations
Military units and formations established in 2015
fr:30e escadre de chasse